, was a Japanese composer for orchestras, vocal, and traditional Japanese instrumentation. He was born in Nagano City, Nagano Prefecture.  Although nationalistic he did not compose until his thirties, which was after the period of Imperial expansionism.

Selection of works 
 Many works by Koyama are published by Ongaku-no-tomo-sha.

Orchestral 
 1946 Shinano bayashi for Orchestra
 1953/1958 Japanese Folk Songs for Chamber Orchestra
 1957 Kobiki-Uta (Woodcutter's Song) for Orchestra
 1959 Symphonic Suite "Nohmen" (Masks for Play)
 1964 Ainu no Uta for string orchestra
 1976 Hinauta No. 1 for Orchestra
 1978 Hinauta No. 2 for Orchestra
 1981 Hinauta No. 3 for orchestra
 1988 Hinauta No. 4 for orchestra

Wind orchestra 
1970 Kobiki-uta for band
1970 Mogura-oi
1970 Otemoyan
1970 Echigo-jishi 
1970 Dai-kagura
1980 Flow Festival
1991 Hinauta No. 5
1993 Noh-men

Choral 
 Lullaby of Itsuki

Piano 
 1966 Kagome Variations
 1969 Variations on "Kari kari watare"
 Children Songs for piano
 Collection of piano pieces
 Intro to piano thru Japanese harmony
 Coming Summer (Natsu wa kinu)

Traditional Japanese instruments 
 1962 Ubusuna for koto and other Japanese musical instruments
 1962 Quartet No. 1 for Japanese instruments
 1963 Okume - Okiku
 1964 Wagakki no tame no gassōkyoku
 1965 Urashima Taro kodomo no yume
 1966 Fudo yonsho
 1968 Trio for 2 koto and jūshichi-gen
 1968 Quartet No. 2 "Theme and Variations" for Japanese instruments
 1971 Akatsuchi ni naru imōto
 1973 Wagakki no tame no gojūsōkyoku, Quintet for Japanese instruments
 1976 Chidori ni yoru hen'yō (Transfiguration by Chidori)
 1978 Wagakki no tame no hensōkyoku, Variations for Japanese instruments
 1980 Hagoromo
 1985 Nenyamonya Hensōkyoku (Nenyamonya Variations)
 1996 Sakura sakura for koto ensemble
 Tenchi sosei
 Trio for 2 koto and jūshichi-gen

Operas
 1972 Sansho Dayu 
 1974 Konyaku Mondo

References

 Kiyoshige Koyama, Nihon no hibiki wo tsukuru, ongaku-no-tomo-sha, 2004.

1914 births
2009 deaths
20th-century classical composers
20th-century Japanese composers
21st-century classical composers
21st-century Japanese composers
Japanese classical composers
Japanese male classical composers
Japanese opera composers
Male opera composers
Musicians from Nagano Prefecture
People from Nagano Prefecture
20th-century Japanese male musicians
21st-century Japanese male musicians